Los Testigos Islands (Witnesses Islands) are a group of islands in the southeastern Caribbean Sea. They are a part of the Dependencias Federales (Federal Dependencies) of Venezuela.

Geography
The coordinates of the main island are .The archipelago has an area of 6.53 square km (2.52 square miles) (1) and consists of 6 major islands and a number of smaller rock islets.

The larger islands are:
 Isla Testigo Grande, main island
 Isla Conejo, east of the main island
 Isla Iguana, south of the main island
 Isla Morro Blanco, south of the main island
 Isla Noreste, northeast of the main island
 Isla Rajado, east of the main island

The larger rock islets are:
 El Chivo
 Peñón de Fuera

The population is about 200 inhabitants (according to 2001 census) mostly being fishing families. There is a small military base operated by the Venezuelan navy on the main island.

History
In 1938, the islands were put under the administration of the Ministerio del Interior y de Justicia (Ministry of Interior and Justice) (2) as part of the Dependencias Federales.

On August 9, 1972, the islands, together with the other islands of the Dependencias Federales, were declared a national park (3) with the park being established on August 18.

See also
Federal Dependencies of Venezuela
List of marine molluscs of Venezuela
List of Poriferans of Venezuela

References

External links
 About Los Testigos Islands
 Map of the Dependencias Federales with location of the Los Testigos Islands
 Map of Los Testigos Islands

Federal Dependencies of Venezuela
Venezuelan islands of the Leeward Antilles